Michele Benedetti may refer to:

 Michele Benedetti (bass) (1778–after 1828), Italian bass
 Michele Benedetti (diver) (born 1984), Italian diver